Powrie may refer to:
Powrie or redcap, a malevolent mythological dwarf-like creature
Powrie Castle, 16th-century castle located in the north of Dundee, Scotland
Fiona Powrie (born 1963), head of the Kennedy Institute of Rheumatology at the University of Oxford
Ian Powrie (1923–2011), Scottish country dance musician and fiddle player
Polly Powrie (born 1987), New Zealand sailor
James Powrie (1815–1895), Scottish geologist

See also
Kelvin Powrie Conservation Park, named after James Kelvin Powrie